JP/Politikens Hus A/S (House of JP/Politiken) is a Danish media company.

History and profile
JP/Politikens Hus was established on 1 January 2003 as a merger between Politikens Hus and Jyllands-Posten A/S, publishing companies of the major broadsheet newspapers Politiken and Jyllands-Posten, respectively. The company also own Politikens tabloid Ekstra Bladet, Watch Medier and Finans. A free daily, 24timer, was added in 2006 (closed/merged in 2013).

In addition to publishing these newspapers, JP/Politikens Hus' businesses also include book publishing, printing, local newspapers in Denmark and Sweden, as well as a number of multi-media concerns.

The merger between the publishing companies was administrative, and editorial independence was retained.

See also
 European Press Prize

References

External links
 Official website
 

2003 establishments in Denmark
Mass media companies established in 2003
Mass media companies of Denmark
Newspaper companies of Denmark
Jyllands-Posten